Bill Graham Archives v. Dorling Kindersley, Ltd., 448 F.3d 605 (2d Cir. 2006), is a case in the United States Court of Appeals for the Second Circuit regarding the fair use of images in a pictorial history text.  

Dorling Kindersley ("DK") is a publisher of popular books, including colorful picture books for children and "coffee table books".  In October 2003, DK and Grateful Dead Productions published Grateful Dead: The Illustrated Trip. The book was a 480-page coffee table book that included a wide variety of Grateful Dead-related information and imagery.  The book included a timeline "running continuously through the book, chronologically combining over 2000 images representing dates in the Grateful Dead's history with explanatory text."

DK had sought permission from Bill Graham Archives ("BGA") for the use of seven images but after negotiations fell through used the images without permission.  The seven images were originally Grateful Dead event posters, and they were reproduced as thumbnails along the timeline, along with captions describing the actual events.

DK declined to pay BGA's licensing demands after publication, and BGA sued.  The District Court (SDNY) granted summary judgment to DK on their fair use defense.  Bill Graham Archives appealed to the Second Circuit.  DK, represented by copyright litigator Richard Dannay, again asserted fair use, and the Second Circuit affirmed:  "We agree with the district court that DK's use of the copyrighted images is protected as fair use."

References

United States copyright case law
United States Court of Appeals for the Second Circuit cases
2006 in American law
Fair use case law
Grateful Dead
Penguin Books